Dobate Bishwakarma is a Nepali politician of Nepali Congress and Minister in Gandaki government since 11 October 2021. He is also serving as member of the Gandaki Province Provincial Assembly.

Bishwakarma was elected to the 2017 provincial assembly elections from the proportional list for Dalit representation. He joined Krishna Chandra Nepali cabinet as Minister for Internal Affairs on 11 October 2021.

Reference 

Nepali Congress politicians from Gandaki Province
Provincial cabinet ministers of Nepal
Members of the Provincial Assembly of Gandaki Province
Year of birth missing (living people)
Living people